Henry Bunny (7 October 1822 – 15 February 1891) was a 19th-century Member of Parliament in the Wairarapa, New Zealand.

Early life
Henry Bunny was born in 1822 in Newbury in Berkshire, the second son of Jere Bunny, solicitor, of that town and his wife, Clara, only surviving daughter of Samuel Slocock, banker, also of Newbury. He married Catherine Bunny (née Baker, born 24 June 1818 in Newbury) on 22 October 1844.

Scandal in England
Bunny was a partner in his father's firm of Newbury solicitors. He was town clerk of Newbury between 1849 and 1853. He fled to New Zealand in 1853 and was declared a bankrupt after the scandalous collapse of a property development scheme at Donnington Square in Newbury. He was struck off by the Law Society in 1859.

Career in New Zealand

Bunny emigrated to New Zealand together with his wife and children, his sister and her husband, Rev. Arthur Baker, on the Duke of Portland, leaving Plymouth on 19 November 1853. He settled on a sheep station in the Wairarapa and built a house named Longwood after Napoleon's residence in exile on Saint Helena. Bunny applied to the New Zealand Bar, was admitted in 1858, but became the first member to be disbarred when it was discovered his sponsor, Rev. Arthur Baker, was his brother-in-law.  Baker became involved in a later scandal and was branded 'the horse-whipped vicar'.

Bunny was on the Wellington Provincial Council, representing Wairarapa (1864–1865) and then Wairarapa West (1865–1876). He was on the Executive Council (1871–1873) and was Secretary-Treasurer and the Council's last Deputy-Superintendent in 1876.

At the nomination meeting, Thomas Dwan, Alfred Newman and Henry Bunny were proposed as candidates, with Dwan winning the show of hands. At the election on 14 May 1884, Newman, Bunny and Dwan received 636, 379 and 121 votes, respectively.

Family, death and commemoration
Bunny's first wife died on 24 July 1864. She was buried at Bolton Street Cemetery in Wellington. On 30 January 1867 at Featherston, Bunny married Eliza "Bessie" Thorne, the daughter of Samuel Thorne from Chapeltown in Yorkshire, England.

On 3 October 1867 at St Mary's Cathedral in Wellington, Isabella Mary Bunny (1849–1932), his second daughter from his first marriage, married Lowther Broad (1840–1892). Broad had been goldfields warden at Queenstown, was resident magistrate in Arrowtown at the time of their wedding, and later a judge at the District Court in Nelson. Charles Broad (1828–1879) was Lowther Broad's elder brother. Charles Harrington Broad (1872–1959), a cricketer and school principal, was the son of Isabella and Lowther Broad.

In 1878 his daughter Eleanor Caroline (Nellie) Bunny (1860–1938) married runholder Edward Riddiford.

Bunny committed suicide on 15 February 1891. He went to the Road Board office in his home town Featherston, asked for the key to the office and once he arrived there, shot himself through the heart with a revolver.  He was buried at Featherston Cemetery.  The village of Bunnythorpe is named after him. His second wife died at Opaki, a small village near Masterton, in 1915 aged 80. She was buried at Masterton Cemetery.

Notes

References

1822 births
1891 deaths
Members of the New Zealand House of Representatives
People from Newbury, Berkshire
People from Featherston, New Zealand
English solicitors
Suicides by firearm in New Zealand
New Zealand politicians who committed suicide
Unsuccessful candidates in the 1881 New Zealand general election
Unsuccessful candidates in the 1884 New Zealand general election
Unsuccessful candidates in the 1887 New Zealand general election
Unsuccessful candidates in the 1890 New Zealand general election
New Zealand MPs for North Island electorates
19th-century New Zealand politicians
19th-century English lawyers
1890s suicides
Riddiford family